Family Album No.2 is the twelfth studio album by Australian country music artist John Williamson. The album was released in September 1996 and peaked at number 100 on the ARIA Charts. It's the second "Family Album" following JW's Family Album in 1990. The album was promoted with a national commercial

Track listing

Charts

Release history

References

1996 albums
John Williamson (singer) albums
EMI Records albums